The Unwelcome Stranger is a 1935 American drama film directed by Phil Rosen and starring Jack Holt, Mona Barrie, and Ralph Morgan. It was released on April 20, 1935.

Cast list
 Jack Holt as Howard Chamberlain
 Mona Barrie as Madeleine Chamberlain
 Ralph Morgan as Mike Monahan
 Jackie Searl as Andy "Gimpy" Campbell
 Bradley Page as Lucky Palmer
 Frankie Darro as Charlie Anderson
 Sam McDaniel as Pot Roast
 Frank Orth as Jackson

References

External links 
 
 
 

Columbia Pictures films
Films directed by Phil Rosen
1935 drama films
1935 films
American drama films
American black-and-white films
1930s American films